Lademacher is a surname. Notable people with the surname include: 

Claire Lademacher (born 1985), see Princess Claire of Luxembourg
Dany Lademacher (born 1950), Belgian guitarist
Hartmut Lademacher (born 1948), German entrepreneur
Horst Lademacher (born 1931), German historian